Marcelle Hainia (1896–1968) was a French stage and film actress.

Filmography

References

Bibliography
 Nicholas Macdonald. In Search of La Grande Illusion: A Critical Appreciation of Jean Renoir's Elusive Masterpiece. McFarland, 2013.

External links

1896 births
1968 deaths
French film actresses
French stage actresses
French television actresses
Actresses from Paris
20th-century French actresses